Luigi Sacchi (August 4, 1805 – June 22, 1861) was an Italian painter and engraver, but is chiefly notable as an early photographer, active mostly around his native city of Milan.

He trained at the Accademia delle Belle Arti di Brera and worked both as a painter and an engraver before taking up photography in 1845 along with his brother, specialising in architectural photography. In 1859 the Sacchi brothers began publishing an art and photography magazine titled L'Artista from the studio of Pompeo Pozzi.

Biography 
Luigi Sacchi, who came into contact with the art world from an early age because of the professions of his father Giuseppe and cousin Defendente, enrolled at the Brera Academy in 1822. After an early career in painting, in which he was inspired by Francesco Hayez and Pelagio Palagi, going so far as to exhibit seven oil paintings at the annual Exhibitions of the Imperial Regia Accademia between 1827 and 1829, he shifted his artistic interest to woodcuts and lithography. Driven by a desire to document and popularize the artistic and cultural heritage of the Italian peninsula through these means, he assumed from 1835 the graphic direction of the magazine Cosmorama Pittorico whose general editorship was entrusted to his brother Giuseppe, his father's namesake, and his cousin Defendente. The magazine was a significant success, obtaining subscription requests from several parts of the peninsula in a still pre-unitary Italy.

Notes and references

Further reading
Accademia delle Belle Arti di Brera, Luigi Sacchi lucigrafo a Milano 1805-1861, ed. Marina Miraglia, Milano, Federico Motta, 1996, 
R. Cassanelli, "Luigi Sacchi e le origini della fotografia d'architettura in Italia", in La cultura architettonica nell'età della Restaurazione. Atti del Convegno... 2001, Milano 2002, pp. 385–394 
E. Gorra, La moderna xilografia in Italia, [Annone Brianza] 2011, pp. 18–20, 26–28, 466-469

1805 births
1861 deaths
Italian photographers
Italian engravers
19th-century Italian painters
Italian male painters
Painters from Milan
19th-century Italian male artists